The following is a list of all team-to-team transactions that have occurred in the National Hockey League (NHL) during the 1963–64 NHL season. It lists which team each player has been traded to and for which player(s) or other consideration(s), if applicable.

Trades

June

September

October

February

References

Transactions
National Hockey League transactions